Paul Harmon may refer to:

 Paul Harmon (artist) (born 1939), American artist
 Paul Harmon (management author) (born 1942), American management consultant